The City of Bayswater is a local government area in the Western Australian capital city of Perth, about  northeast of Perth's central business district. The City of Bayswater is a member of the Eastern Metropolitan Regional Council.

History

In the 1890s, Bayswater was a small settlement, awkwardly straddling the boundaries of the Perth and Swan Road Districts. In December 1894, residents held a meeting to petition for a road board. The government rejected the petition. A second attempt to get Bayswater's own road board in 1896 was successful. Both the Perth and Swan Road Boards were happy to relinquish responsibility for building roads there. The Bayswater Road Board was gazetted on 5 March 1897, becoming one of several new local government areas established in the 1890s along the railway. A wooden ratepayers' hall was constructed on Guildford Road.

In 1944, at the annual ratepayers' meeting, a majority of the seven ratepayers that attended voted for the board to change the district's name to "Oakleigh Park Road District". The name Bayswater was considered to obstruct progress due to its working-class connotations. After advertising for objections to the change in name, many came in and the idea was ditched. On 1 July 1961, it became a shire following the enactment of the Local Government Act 1960.

In October 1978, the shire council was sacked by the Government of Western Australia for mismanagement, corruption and various actions breaking the Local Government Act. The shire sold council property and several large contracts without tenders. A commissioner was placed in charge of the council for five months. At the next council election on 24 February 1979, 80% of ratepayers voted, much higher than the usual 30%. Only two of the councillors elected had been councillors before.

On 29 October 1983, it attained city status. Around this same time, it relocated its administration from Bayswater to its present location on Broun Avenue in Morley. In 1998 the suburb of Maylands was transferred into the City of Bayswater from the City of Stirling.

The portion of the suburb of Noranda north of Widgee Road was transferred to the City of Bayswater from the City of Swan on 1 July 2016.

Logo
The City of Bayswater's logo features an olive tree, which has history relating to Bayswater. In the 1840s, an olive tree was planted on Slade Street. The tree is still standing today, and it is the earliest sign of European occupation in the area.

Services
The City of Bayswater has three libraries. They are in Maylands, Bayswater and Morley. The city also owns The RISE, Bayswater Waves, Maylands Waterland and Morley Sport and Recreation Centre.

Wards
The city is divided into 4 wards. The mayor and deputy mayor are each elected from among the councillors. Elections are held on the third Saturday in October every odd year, with councillors elected to four year terms. Approximately half of all positions are up for election at each election.

Political parties do not typically endorse candidates in local government in Western Australia. However, elected members are required to disclose membership of any political party.

Suburbs
The suburbs of the City of Bayswater with population and size figures based on the most recent Australian census:

* indicates suburb partially located within city

Population

Mayors

Heritage listed places

As of 2023, 401 places are heritage-listed in the City of Bayswater, of which 24 are on the State Register of Heritage Places, among them Tranby House, the Albany Bell Castle and the Garratt Road Bridge.

References

External links
 
 City of Bayswater Asset Management Information

 
Bayswater